Captive audience may refer to:

Law
 Captive audience meeting, a mandatory meeting used by employers to oppose unionization
 A legal concept in:
 Rowan v. United States Post Office Department, 1970, in which the United States Supreme Court created a quasi-exception to free speech in cases in which a person is held as a "captive audience"
 Lehman v. Shaker Heights, 1974, in which the U.S. Supreme Court upheld a city's ban on political advertising within its public transportation system
 Packer Corporation v. Utah, 1932, about a conflict between First Amendment rights with the public's right of privacy, advancing a theory of the "captive audience"

Arts and entertainment

Television
 "Captive Audience", an episode of Alfred Hitchcock Presents, 1962
 "Captive Audience", an episode of Pacific Blues, 1996
 "Captive Audience", an episode of Red vs. Blue, 2011
 "Captive Audience", a 2011 episode of web TV anthology Suite 7
 "That's My Dad / The Captain's Bird / Captive Audience", an episode of The Love Boat, 1980

Literature
 Captive Audience: The Telecom Industry and Monopoly Power in the New Gilded Age, a 2013 non-fiction book by Susan P. Crawford
 Captive Audience, a 1988 book of poetry by Bob Perelman
 Captive Audience, a 1996 book of poetry by Paul Henry
 Captive Audience, a 1975 novel by Jessica Mann
 "Captive Audience", a 1959 short story in The Bird of Time by Wallace West
 "Captive Audience", a 2002 short story by Frances Hardinge
 Captive Audience, a 1979 play by Desmond Forristal

Music
 "Captive Audience", a song by Say Anything from the 2019 album Oliver Appropriate

Visual arts
 Captive Audience, a 2019 work by artist Najee Dorsey
 Captive Audience, a 2001 work by sculptor David Reekie
 Auditoire captivé ('A captive audience'), an 1877 painting by Frédéric Samuel Cordey

See also
 Captive market